Spalacopsis howdeni is a species of beetle in the family Cerambycidae. It was described by W.H. Tyson in 1970. Tyson in his article - The Spalacopsis of the West Indies and America North of Mexico (Coleoptera: Cerambycidae), describes the beetle as native to the America North of Mexico and West Indies.

References

Spalacopsis
Beetles described in 1970